Kramarovci is a small village in the Municipality of Rogašovci in the Prekmurje region of northeastern Slovenia, right on the border with Austria. 

There is a small chapel in the centre of the settlement. It was built in the early 20th century and has a belfry attached to it. Until 1945 the village had a German majority.

References

External links
 Kramarovci on Geopedia

Populated places in the Municipality of Rogašovci